The Last Brickmaker in America is a 2001 American television Drama film directed by Gregg Champion and written by Richard Leder. Produced by Nasser Entertainment. Distributed by Empire Home Entertainment. The film was released on September 23, 2001 and is available for streaming on Tubi.

Cast 

 Sidney Poitier as Henry Cobb

 Piper Laurie as Ruth Anne 
 Jay O. Sanders as Mike 
 Wendy Crewson as Karen 
 Mert Hatfield as Bank Chairman Charlie Redden 
 Cody Newton as Danny Potter
 Rebecca Koon as Ms. Abbott 
 Julian Adams as Flower Shop Patron 
 Mary Alice as Dorothy Cobb
 Bernie Casey as Lewis 
 Sharon Davis as School Administrator
 Duke Ernsberger as Principal Robert Keenan 
 Dennis Gomez as Construction worker
 Fred Griffith as Teacher
 Joseph Kimray as Choir Member
 Terry Loughlin as Dr. Hayward
 Terry Norman as Ms. Walters
 Tom Nowicki as Carl Douglass

Filming 
The film was shot in Gastonia, North Carolina.

References

External links 
  
 
 The Last Brickmaker in America on Tubi

2000s American films
2000s English-language films
2001 films
American films based on actual events
American drama films